Shanghai Foreign Language School (SFLS) is a secondary school based in  Shanghai, China. It is not a traditional 'language school' as in schools delivering only language teaching. It is a full-time high school providing education to students aged from 11-15 (junior high school) and 15-18 (senior high school). Foreign language teaching is traditionally a specialty.

Shanghai Foreign Language School (SFLS), affiliated with the Shanghai International Studies University (SISU), is a seven-year boarding school located in northeast Shanghai. It covers an area of 33 mu, with the total construction area of 22,508 square meters. SFLS was established in 1963, and reports directly to the Chinese Ministry of Education.

Location
The school is located at 295 Zhongshan Bei Yi Road(), Hongkou District(), Shanghai, China.

In February 2012, SFLS campus was temporarily moved to 730 North Station Road  (车站北路730号) because of the demolition and refurbishment project on old school buildings.

In September 2015, SFLS moved back to the campus due to the finish of the project.

History
It was founded in 1963 as one of China's seven earliest foreign language schools in the metropolis. The school is affiliated with the Shanghai International Studies University.

It is a full-time boarding school specializing in foreign language education. Receiving funds from China's Ministry of Education, it is a renowned middle school in Shanghai supervised jointly by Shanghai Municipal Education Commission and Shanghai International Studies University (SISU).

Teaching methods

SFLS adopts "An Integrated Course of English" as its main teaching material for English classes. Supplementary materials include "Look, Listen and Learn" (Louis George Alexander) for students in 6th to 9th grade (Junior High), and "Look Ahead Books 3 and 4" for students in 9th to 12th grade (Senior High).

Languages classes are smaller than other classes, and are usually between 20-25 students.  Teaching focuses on cultivating students' oral and written abilities in foreign languages. Some of the teaching activities are conducted by foreign experts. The school is equipped with advanced audio-visual equipment.

The school shifted from the traditional teaching methods centering on translation and grammar to a set of "elicitation method of teaching in situations". This emphasizes the students' audio-lingual skills by training their pronunciation and intonation.

Teaching focus

In teaching foreign languages, besides emphasizing students' abilities in different practical situations, the school practices  the "going out and inviting in" method. The so-called "going out" means that a number of students are provided with  opportunities to study abroad as exchange students at locations like Sukura Nobirin College in Japan, Christina College in Hamburg, Germany, La Salle College, Hong Kong, and The Culver Academies, in Indiana US. The so-called "inviting in" means that the school invites foreign visitors so as to provide the students with the opportunity to practice what they have learned in school. Every year, more than 100 students in the school have the chance to receive foreign visitors including members of government delegations, foreign students, and foreign reporters.

In order to extend students' scope of knowledge, the school provides additional courses in the form of the Second Classroom, such as:
 Second foreign language courses
 Selective courses in foreign language study (e.g. Newspaper Reading in Original, Foreign Literature, Foreign History, and Survey of the Countries in the World, etc.)
 Public Relations
 English of Science and Technology
 Cultures and Customs Worldwide
 Reading on Ancient Poems

Departments
Department of Foreign Languages
Department of English
Department of Mathematics
Department of Politics
Department of Chinese
Department of Physics
Department of Chemistry
Department of Biology
Department of Geography
Department of History
Department of Arts
Department of Sports

Languages
English
Russian
French
German
Spanish
Japanese

Seminars
In Activities courses, there are seminars on Spare-time Politics school, and workshops such as "Green-Grass" Literature, Cartoon, Computer, Film Review, Chinese Calligraphy, Sketch, Wind Band, Chorus, Piano, Food Sculpture, Handcraft, and so on.

With the help of the League Branch in each class, the school organizes students to read books in groups. The Senior class has a mobile bookshelf whereas a mini library is found in the Junior class. Now half of the classes have put this program into full play.

SFLS is the head of the National Association of Foreign Language Teaching and Research of foreign languages schools in China. Research results of the association are exchanged at the annual meeting.

Club Activities
The school offers more than 50 club activities for students that include Model United Nations, United States Academic Decathlon, robotics and architecture. Model United Nations has been one of the key activities that students take part in as it is directly related to foreign languages and also foreign relations, two main focuses of the school.
The school also has a football and baseball team. SFLS's floorball team has been one of the most successful in the East China Region, winning the championship twice.

Awards
In 1999, SFLS was awarded Advanced Secondary School in moral education in Shanghai. SFLS students have won prizes such as the first prize in the National Japanese Speech Contest, two special awards in the National English Oral Contest (Junior and Senior respectively), the 3rd, 5th and 7th prizes in the National "World of Water" Contest in German (mainly for Chinese college students). Students of SFLS' "Five Elements Group" (the only team representing Shanghai) were sent to the USA for the Summit of International High School after competition on the Internet.

SFLS students have won many other rewards, such as the first awards, Junior and Senior respectively, in Sino-USA Students' Speech Contest in using the other party's mother tongue; the first and third awards in the global Math Model Contest for college students as well as the first award for four years in a succession in Shanghai's Popular Science English Contest.

Modern technology
To meet the development of modern science and technology, SFLS provides courses like English of Science and Technology and English Newspaper Reading. It has invested 100,000 Yuan in these science courses.

For the past three years, SFLS has spent 300,000 Yuan on relief funds, Hope Project, financial aids to the students in the straightened circumstance, and to the underprivileged students, reducing the fees of government-funded students who study aboard.

Notable alumni
Yang Jiechi, Foreign Minister of China.
Wang Guangya, China's Vice Minister of foreign affairs and permanent representative of the People's Republic of China to the United Nations. Wang was also President of the UN[ Security Council for the month of February 2004.
 Cui Tiankai, Assistant Minister of Foreign Affairs of China

See also
List of Foreign Language Schools in China

References

https://web.archive.org/web/20120109041739/http://www.shisu.edu.cn/skins/skin/include/schoolmap.shtm 
https://web.archive.org/web/20050629004400/http://www.sfls.cn/

External links

High schools in Shanghai
Foreign-language high schools in China
Educational institutions established in 1963
1963 establishments in China